This is a list of Dutch informateurs and formateurs who have served in a Dutch cabinet formation. The position of Scout, that has existed since 2012, is included in this list.

References 

Netherlands politics-related lists